The Professional Footballers' Association of Ireland Players' Young Player of the Year (often called the PFAI Players' Young Player of the Year, the PFAI Young Player of the Year, or simply the Young Player of the Year) award is given to the footballer in the top-flight of Irish football, the League of Ireland, who is seen to have been the best player of the previous season and is under 23 years of age.

The shortlist is compiled by the members of the Professional Footballers' Association of Ireland (the PFAI), and then the winner is voted for by the other players in the league.

The award was first given in 1982, and was won by Bohemians player Jacko McDonagh. The most recent winner of the PFAI Young Player of the Year award was Danny Grant of Bohemians.

UEFA Euro 2016 saw three former winners of the award making appearances at the finals tournament in France, with two of them (Wes Hoolahan of the Republic of Ireland and Niall McGinn of Northern Ireland) scoring goals for their countries.

List of winners
Highlighted players are winning the award for a second time.

2020s

2010s

2000s

1990s

1980s

Breakdown of winners

Winners by club

Winners by country

Trivia
In 2000, Richie Baker became the first – and so far only – player to win the award twice. He achieved this feat by winning the award in successive seasons
In 1990, the award was shared between Vinny Arkins and Tony Cousins.  This is the only year that the award was shared.
In 1989, Liam Coyle became the first player from outside of the Republic of Ireland to win the award.

See also
PFAI Players' Player of the Year
PFAI Team of the Year

External links
Professional Footballers Association of Ireland
rsssf.com

 
Ireland
Awards established in 1982
1982 establishments in Ireland
Annual events in Ireland
Association football player non-biographical articles